Lima is a village in the town of Lima, Livingston County, New York, United States. The population of Lima village was 2,139 at the 2010 census, out of 4,305 in the entire town.

History 

The village was founded in 1788 by Paul Davison and Jonathan Gould, veterans of the Sullivan Campaign, who had seen the area during the American Revolution. The village of Lima was organized in 1797 as the "Village of Charleston", but in 1808 the name was changed to "Lima", after Old Lyme, Connecticut. (For that reason, the name of the village is currently pronounced like the name of the bean, not like the name of the city in Peru).

The Genesee Wesleyan Seminary (1830) / Genesee College (1849) was one of the first co-educational schools in the country when it opened in 1822. Eventually, determined by a Methodist-Episcopal convention in 1870, the college was shut in favor of the newly developed Syracuse University (1871), over the protests of the residents of Lima.

Notable people
 Belva Ann Lockwood, first female attorney to practice before the Supreme Court
 Kenneth Keating, U.S. representative, senator, and ambassador to Israel
 James Edward Quigley, former archbishop of Chicago
 W. W. Thayer, former governor of Oregon
 Henry Jarvis Raymond, founder of the New York Times

National Register of Historic Places

The following sites are listed on the National Register of Historic Places.

|}

Geography
Lima is located near the northeastern corner of Livingston County at  (42.906511, -77.612808), at the center of the town of Lima. It is at the intersection of conjoined New York State Route 5/U.S. Route 20 (in part, Avon Lima Road and East Main Street) and New York State Route 15A (in part Rochester Road and Plank Road).

The eastern boundary of the village is formed by Spring Brook, a northward-flowing tributary of Honeoye Creek and part of the Genesee River watershed.

Demographics

As of the census of 2000, there were 2,459 people, 770 households, and 532 families. The population density was 1,783.4 people per square mile (688.0/km2). There were 800 housing units at an average density of 580.2 per square mile (223.8/km2). The racial makeup of the village was 95.65% White, 1.46% Black or African American, 0.41% Native American, 0.73% Asian, 0.12% Pacific Islander, 0.49% from other races, and 1.14% from two or more races. Hispanic or Latino of any race were 1.71% of the population.

There were 770 households, out of which 36.6% had children under the age of 18 living with them, 55.3% were married couples living together, 10.0% had a female householder with no husband present, and 30.8% were non-families. 25.6% of all households were made up of individuals, and 9.9% had someone living alone who was 65 years of age or older. The average household size was 2.59 and the average family size was 3.15.

In the village, the population was spread out, with 22.6% under the age of 18, 19.0% from 18 to 24, 29.4% from 25 to 44, 20.7% from 45 to 64, and 8.3% who were 65 years of age or older. The median age was 32 years. For every 100 females, there were 95.0 males. For every 100 females age 18 and over, there were 93.9 males.

The median income for a household in the village was $41,646, and the median income for a family was $52,102. Males had a median income of $29,966 versus $25,429 for females. The per capita income for the village was $15,622. 5.3% of the population and 3.4% of families were below the poverty line. 3.4% of those under the age of 18 and 6.6% of those 65 and older are all living below the poverty line.

References

External links

 

Villages in New York (state)
Rochester metropolitan area, New York
Populated places established in 1788
Villages in Livingston County, New York
1788 establishments in New York (state)